Carnival Vista is a cruise ship operated by Carnival Cruise Line.

History

The ship was delivered on April 28, 2016. Sea trials were completed in March 2016. The ship's maiden voyage embarked on May 1, 2016 from Trieste, Italy on a 13-day Europe Cruise that ended in Barcelona, Spain. Carnival Vista is the first ship in Carnival's . The ship was christened in New York City by its godmother, Miss USA 2016 Deshauna Barber.

On August 28, 2016, Carnival Vistas wake caused extensive damage to the tourist harbor of Marina del Nettuno, near Messina, Italy.

On June 21, 2019, it was announced by Carnival Cruise Line that three scheduled cruises would be cancelled due to performance issues with the ship's propulsion system. The heavy-lift ship  was used as a floating dry dock for repairs to the azipod propulsion system. This operation was selected over Grand Bahama Shipyard's drydocks after one of the shipyards cranes collapsed on Royal Caribbean's .

Design and construction
By gross tonnage, Carnival Vista  was the largest ship within Carnival Cruise Line's fleet until the 2018-built , a sister ship to Carnival Vista. The ship was constructed in the Fincantieri shipyard of Monfalcone (Gorizia) and was delivered in April 2016. The first steel for the ship was cut in late February 2014, and the keel was laid in October 2014. The Carnival Vistas coin ceremony/float out was done in June 2015.

Carnival Vista was the first Carnival cruise ship fitted with ABB azipod propulsion units since the 2004-built .

Home port
From May to October 2016, Carnival Vista operated an inaugural season in the Mediterranean before repositioning to New York to offer a pair of cruises. She then moved to her new home-port in Miami, Florida, in November 2016 where she sailed year-round until September 2018 when she moved to Galveston, Texas. She offered six, seven, and eight day Caribbean cruises with ports of call such as Ocho Rios, Montego Bay, Grand Cayman, Cozumel, Aruba, Curaçao, and Bonaire.

Since moving to Galveston, Carnival Vista has offered two primary itineraries: Cozumel, Grand Cayman, and Montego Bay and an itinerary with calls in Cozumel, Belize, and Roatán.

Carnival Vistas homeport will move to Port Canaveral (Orlando, Florida) in November 2023. After transferring homeports, the Carnival Vista will be replaced by the upcoming .

Incidents 

In July 2019, when the vessel was underway to its call in Galveston, it temporarily lost power in the middle of the Gulf of Mexico.

On 28 November 2019, seven passengers aboard Carnival Vista were on an independent bus tour in Belize when the bus crashed, resulting into two deaths and five injuries.

On 6 March 2020, a man was charged in the alleged assault of a teenage boy aboard the ship.

In May 2022, Carnival Vista began to experience propulsion issues which affected its maximum speed, similar to the incident in June 2019. Because of this some itineraries were altered while underway. No official announcement has been made by Carnival Cruise Line as of May 19, 2022. The company's brand ambassador John Heald made a statement that technicians would meet the ship in Galveston to fix the propulsion system. As of June 2022, no further problems have been reported.

Coronavirus pandemic 
During the coronavirus pandemic, the CDC reported, as early as 22 April 2020, that at least one person who tested for SARS-CoV-2 had tested positive within 14 days post-disembarkation.

Links

External links

 

Vista
Ships built in Monfalcone
Ships built by Fincantieri
2015 ships